Thomas Lockyer (1699-1785), of Mapperton, near Ilchester, Somerset and New Buildings, Coleman Street, London, was an English businessman. He was a Member of Parliament for Ilchester (UK Parliament constituency) 1747 - 1761.

References

1699 births
1785 deaths
18th-century English businesspeople
People from Ilchester, Somerset